Antonia Brickell is an experienced broadcaster, podcaster, narrator, voice-over artist and communications specialist. With a 17-year career in radio as a British radio personality, she presented and produced programmes for the BBC in London, Yorkshire, Northamptonshire, Cambridgeshire and across the East of England. She started out with GWR commercial radio (now known as Heart radio).

Career

Cambridge
Originally from London, Antonia began in radio on the breakfast show at Q103 Cambridge in 1996.

Northamptonshire
In 2000, she joined the BBC as a presenter and reporter on BBC Radio Northampton. She presented shows including early breakfast, afternoons and weekend mid-mornings. 

In 2001, Antonia also began working as a voice-over artist and was signed up with agency: Voicebookers.com

London
She also presented overnights and late nights on BBC London.

At around this time, Antonia started working with independent production company Unique Facilities as a regular voice-over artist, where she hosted weekly audio shows that were syndicated throughout the UK.

Sheffield
Antonia settled for a time in South Yorkshire when she was offered a job presenting BBC Radio Sheffield's lunchtime slot from March 10, 2003. 

From there she was moved to a breakfast show alongside local comic Toby Foster on 20 September 2004.  That show continued for a few months, before the two presenters were given their own slots, which ran back-to-back on the station's weekday schedule. Antonia presented Breakfast and Toby presented Mid-mornings.

Cambridgeshire
After Radio Sheffield, Antonia moved to BBC Radio Cambridgeshire where she presented Antonia Brickell's Drivetime.

East of England
At the end of 2010, Antonia left her Drivetime show at BBC Cambridgeshire to work across a number of roles. Alongside mentoring radio presenters for the BBC College of Journalism, she continued with her voice-overs, she worked as a media trainer and as a communications consultant for regional charity Magpas Air Ambulance. During this time, she also regularly stepped in to present the BBC regional radio evening show, across the East of England.

Three years later, Antonia joined Magpas Air Ambulance as their Head of Communications. 

In August 2020, Antonia left her role with the charity and has since returned to utilising her voice for a living. 

As well as telling people's stories; Antonia now project manages and hosts podcasts, she does voice-over work, narration and media training for organisations.

References

External links
Antonia Brickell on LinkedIn
Antonia Brickell’s Drivetime Show Online
Presenter Profile - Radio Sheffield (bbc.co.uk)
Presenter Profile - Radio Cambridgeshire
Press Release 2004 - Start of Breakfast Show
Radio Today Article - Changes at BBC Cambridgeshire

British radio personalities
Living people
1971 births
Place of birth missing (living people)